= Serbian alphabet (disambiguation) =

Serbian alphabet may refer to:

- Serbian Cyrillic alphabet
- Serbian Latin alphabet
